Gods is a 2014 Polish biographical feature film directed by Łukasz Palkowski. It is based on the life and career of Polish cardiac surgeon Zbigniew Religa, who performed the first successful heart transplant in Poland in 1987. The movie received the Golden Lions award for best film at the 39th Gdynia Film Festival (2014) and the Eagle at the Polish Film Awards (2015). Production of the film took place in autumn 2013.

Cast
 Tomasz Kot – Zbigniew Religa
 Piotr Głowacki – Marian Zembala
 Szymon Piotr Warszawski – Andrzej Bochenek
 Magdalena Czerwińska – Anna Religa
 Rafał Zawierucha – Romuald Cichoń
 Marta Ścisłowicz – nurse Magda
 Karolina Piechota – nurse Krysia
 Wojciech Solarz – anesthesiologist
 Arkadiusz Janiczek – perfusionist
 Cezary Kosiński – Roman Włodarski
 Konrad Bugaj – doctor
 Magdalena Kaczmarek – nurse Jolka
 Magdalena Wróbel – nurse Michalina
 Milena Suszyńska – nurse Gośka
 Jan Englert – professor Wacław Sitkowski
 Władysław Kowalski – Jan Moll
 Zbigniew Zamachowski – Stanisław Pasyk
 Marian Opania – Jan Nielubowicz
 Małgorzata Łata –  Ewka
 Kinga Preis – Ewka's mother
 Ryszard Kotys – ethics committee member
 Włodzimierz Adamski – ethics committee member
 Marian Zembala – ethics committee member
 Andrzej Bochenek – ethics committee member
 David Price – speaker (Dr. Barnard)
 Magdalena Lamparska – waitress

See also
Cinema of Poland
List of Gdynia Film Festival winners

References

External links
 
 Bogowie at the Polish Internet Movie Database 
 Official movie trailer at the producer's official YouTube channel (in Polish)

2014 films
2014 biographical drama films
Polish biographical drama films
Films set in hospitals
Biographical films about surgeons
2014 drama films
Films directed by Łukasz Palkowski